The Screen Award for Best Female Playback is chosen by a distinguished panel of judges from the Indian Bollywood film industry and the winners are announced in January.

Superlatives

Most wins

List of nominations and winners

1990s

2000s

2010s

2020s

See also

 List of music awards honoring women
 Screen Awards

References

External links
Official site

Screen Awards
Music awards honoring women